Choi Min-hwan (Japanese:チェ•ミンファン; born 11 November 1992), also known by his mononym Minhwan, is a South Korean singer, musician, drummer and actor. He is a member of rock band F.T. Island, in which he serves as the drummer and backing vocalist. He is the youngest member of the group.

Music career

F.T. Island

F.T. Triple
In January 2009, members Choi Jong-hoon, Choi Min-hwan, and Lee Jae-jin were put into the sub group "A3". This group debuted at the 2009 New Year concert My First Dream held at the JCB Hall in Tokyo, Japan on 2 January 2009. Minhwan performed as the drummer and a sub-vocalist. The group's name was "A3" due to each of the three members having type A blood. This group was formed to help take up some singing time during their concerts, so that lead singer, Lee Hong-gi, would not over-strain his voice.

In late 2009, the triple-member group was renamed F.T. Triple, with Choi Min-hwan as drummer and sub vocalist. They released the single Love Letter and began performing on music shows. During this time, F.T. Island's main vocalist Lee Hongki was busy filming a TV series and guitarist Song Seung-hyun was involved in several variety shows.

Solo Debut
On 29 April 2018, Min-hwan released his first single titled "First Story" with 3 tracks.

Acting career
Choi made his acting debut in 2009 in the TV drama The Road Home. On 23 March 2009, he collapsed while waiting to film. Choi was rushed to the hospital for treatment; he had been suffering from a cold and overwork, and was discharged the next day.

He also appeared in cameos in the film Unstoppable Marriage (2007), and the television series On Air (2008), and Style (2009).

Choi then starred in the musical Gwanghwamun Sonata. His character Ji-yong is a music director and singer with a bright personality. The musical ran from 10 November 2012 in Osaka, Japan, until January 2013 in Tokyo.

In June 2013, Choi joined the cast of Goong: Musical in Japan. He played the leading role of crown prince Lee Shin.

In January 2014 he played the main character in the musical Joseph Amazing.

Personal life
In September 2017, Choi's agency confirmed that he was dating former Laboum member Kim Yul-hee. On January 4, 2018, Choi personally delivered the news of his engagement to Kim via his Instagram and revealed his plans to marry later that year. He subsequently announced on May 9 that Kim was pregnant and that they planned to marry on October 19, 2018. Their son, Jae-yul, was born on May 18, 2018. Choi, Kim, and Jae-yul joined the cast of the second season of Mr. House Husband in January 2019.

On August 28, 2019, Choi and Kim announced that they were expecting twins. On February 11, 2020, Choi announced on Instagram that Kim gave birth to twin girls. Following his daughters' births, Choi began his mandatory military service on February 24 as a reserve soldier, which enables him to commute from home during his service and care for his family.  Choi was discharged from the military on September 2, 2021 and he rejoined as a cast member in the program Mr. House Husband

Filmography

TV series

Musical

References

External links
 
 

1992 births
Living people
South Korean male idols
South Korean pop rock singers
South Korean male television actors
FNC Entertainment artists
F.T. Island members
School of Performing Arts Seoul alumni
Kyung Hee Cyber University alumni